The Guam women's national football team is the female representative football team for Guam.

History
The Guam Women's National Football Team earned Guam's first-ever victory over a FIFA member nation after Guam Football Association obtained full FIFA member status in 1996. Taylor Dervish and Kelly Hogan Morphy scored in the 55th and 60th minutes in Guam's 2–0 win over Hong Kong on Nov. 11, 1999 at the AFC Women's Championship that year. Guam competed in Asia's flagship women's tournament in each edition from 1997 through to the 2006 edition. Guam was registered to play in the 2018 AFC Women's Asian Cup qualifiers; however, after being drawn into Group C in Palestine, the team pulled out of the competition, as did the Lebanon Women's National Team.

The team earned its highest FIFA/Coca-Cola Women's World Ranking in 2003 following its silver medal finish at the 2003 South Pacific Games in Suva, Fiji under Head Coach Tom Renfro.

Statistics/Results from the 2003 South Pacific Games in Suva, Fiji for the Guam Women's National Team:

Overall record of 3–1–2 (W-L-D) in round robin play, losing the gold medal to Papua New Guinea (4–1–1)

Guam was the best team defensively, allowing the fewest goals in the tournament: 2

Guam, 1–0 over Fiji (Kristin Thompson scored in the 35th minute)

Guam, 0–0 draw with Tonga

Guam 1–1 draw with Tahiti (Michele (Presnell) Madantschi scored in the 29th minute)

Guam 5–0 over Kiribati (Rachelle Camacho scored in the 1st and 11th minutes, Tera Hannah scored in the 6th minute, Ana Hannah scored in the 47th minute, Aika Young scored in the 87th minute)

Guam 1–0 over Vanuatu (Rachelle Camacho scored in the 8th minute)

Guam lost its first and only match 1–0 against PNG; PNG scored in the 69th minute

The Guam Women's National Team competes regularly in the East Asian Football Federation flagship tournament, now called the EAFF E-1 Football Championship. The team first played in the tournament's preliminary competition in 2007 against round winners Korea Republic, Chinese Taipei, and Hong Kong.

In 2012, under head coach Elias Merfalen (GUM), the Guam Women's National Team officially coined the nickname "Masakåda" which means "brave woman" in the local Chamorro language, ahead of the 2013 EAFF East Asian Cup Preliminary Competition Round 1 in Guam played at the LeoPalace Resort Guam in July 2012. In the preliminary competition, Guam finished second behind Hong Kong. Down 0–3 at half time, Guam managed to level the match by the 72nd minute with two goals from captain Anjelica Perez and one from Paige Surber. Hong Kong later scored the game winner in the 76th minute to advance to the tournament Preliminary Competition Round 2.

In 2014, under head coach Sang Hoon Kim (KOR), the Masakåda qualified for Round 2 of the EAFF tournament, first defeating the Northern Mariana Islands 7–0 and next, earning its biggest win to date against a FIFA member nation, an 11–0 shutout of Macau. Guam's Samantha Kaufman won Tournament MVP honors and teammate Paige Surber won the Tournament Golden Boot Award.

In 2016, under head coach Mark Chargualaf (GUM), the Masakåda again qualified for Round 2 of the EAFF tournament, again with back-to-back 5–0 shutout wins over both the Northern Mariana Islands and Macau. Guam's Samantha Kaufman repeated as Tournament MVP, while also earning the Co-Golden Boot Award with teammate Paige Surber.

The team later traveled to Hong Kong for Round 2 of the tournament under Head Coach Belinda Wilson (AUS). Wilson later was appointed Technical Director of Guam Football Association from 2017 to 2019.

Guam competed in the 2019 EAFF E-1 Football Championship Preliminary Competition Round 1 and finished second to host country Mongolia, despite scoring the most goals and allowing the fewest goals in the tournament.

Team image

Nicknames
The Guam women's national football team has been known or nicknamed as the "Masakåda".

Home stadium
The team plays at the Guam National Football Stadium in Hagåtña. It holds 1,000.

Results and fixtures

The following is a list of match results in the last 12 months, as well as any future matches that have been scheduled.

Legend

2021

Coaching staff

Current coaching staff

Managerial history

Players

Current squad
The following players were called up to the squad for the AFC Women's Asian Cup India 2022 (AFC Women's Asian Cup India 2022 Qualifiers) held in Kyrgyz Republic 14–24 October 2021.

Caps and goals accurate up to and including 12 September 2021.

Recent call-ups
The following players have been called up to the squad in the past 12 months.

Records

*Active players in bold, statistics correct as of 1 November 2020.

Most capped players

Top goalscorers

Competitive record

FIFA Women's World Cup

*Draws include knockout matches decided on penalty kicks.

AFC Women's Asian Cup

*Draws include knockout matches decided on penalty kicks.

EAFF E-1 Football Championship

Pacific Games

*Draws include knockout matches decided on penalty kicks.

See also

Sport in Guam
Football in Guam
Women's football in Guam
Guam men's national football team
Guam men's national under-19 football team
Guam men's national under-17 football team

References

 https://www.fifa.com/about-fifa/associations/GUM

External links
 Guam women's national football team – official website at GuamFA

Asian women's national association football teams
Football in Guam
1997 establishments in Guam
W